Oei Hui-lan (21 December 1889 – 1992), known as Madame Wellington Koo, was a Chinese-Indonesian international socialite and style icon, and, from late 1926 until 1927, the First Lady of the Republic of China. She was married firstly to British consular agent Beauchamp Caulfield-Stoker, then to the pre-communist Chinese statesman Wellington Koo, and was a daughter and heiress of the colonial Indonesian tycoon Oei Tiong Ham, Majoor der Chinezen.

Both the parents of Oei Hui-lan hailed from the establishment: her father stemmed from one of the wealthiest families in Java, while her mother came from the 'Cabang Atas' aristocracy as a descendant of a Luitenant der Chinezen in Semarang's 18th-century Dutch bureaucracy. After an unsuccessful marriage with Caulfield-Stoker, she met Wellington Koo while in Paris in 1920. They married in Brussels the following year and first lived in Geneva in connection with the establishment of the League of Nations. In 1923, she moved with her husband to Beijing where he served as Acting Premier in the evolving republican Chinese state. During his second term (October 1926—June 1927), Wellington Koo also acted as President of the Republic of China for a brief period, making Oei Hui-lan the First Lady of China. The couple then spent time in Shanghai, Paris and London where Oei Hui-lan became a celebrated hostess. In 1941, she moved to New York where she died in 1992.

Oei Hui-lan, or Madame Koo as she became known, is also remembered for writing two autobiographies and for her  contributions to fashion, especially her adaptations of traditional Chinese dress.

Biography

Early life

Oei Hui-lan was born on 21 December 1889 into a leading Peranakan Chinese family in Semarang, Central Java, then part of the Dutch East Indies, now Indonesia. Her father, the tycoon Majoor-titulair Oei Tiong Ham, headed Kian Gwan, a trading company founded by her grandfather Oei Tjie Sien in 1863 that became the largest conglomerate in Southeast Asia at the start of the twentieth century.

Her mother, Goei Bing-nio, was her father's senior wife and – unlike the nouveau riche Oei family – came from the Cabang Atas, the traditional Chinese establishment of colonial Indonesia. Through her mother, Hui-lan was descended from the merchant-mandarin Goei Poen Kong (1765–1806), who served as estate master or Boedelmeester, then Luitenant der Chinezen in Semarang in the late eighteenth century. The Chinese officership, consisting of the ranks of Majoor, Kapitein and Luitenant der Chinezen, was a civil government position in the Dutch colonial bureaucracy of Indonesia. Oei's maternal Goei family traces its roots and prominence in Semarang back to the 1770s. Goei Bing-nio's family had initially resisted Oei Tiong Ham's social and economic rise.

Hui-lan, who used the name Angèle in her youth, had an elder sister, Oei Tjong-lan, aka Gwendoline, from the same mother. In addition, her father had 18 junior wives and acknowledged concubines, as well as some 42 acknowledged children, including her half-brother Oei Tjong Hauw.

The two Oei sisters as daughters of Oei's senior wife lived with their father and were educated at home by a string of European tutors and governesses in Semarang, receiving a thoroughly modern upbringing by the standards of the times. This mirrored the westernization of the Cabang Atas in colonial Indonesia from the late nineteenth century onwards. In addition to her native Malay, Hui-lan acquired fluent English and French, and decent Hokkien, Mandarin and Dutch.

In 1905, Hui-lan and her sister were part of a recital in Singapore, where they were studying music. It was publicized in a local newspaper, as was a recital she gave in Semarang:

"The three cornered novelty of a young Chinese girl singing in French to an English audience in a Malay country next occupied the attention of the audience. This was “Farfalla” by Ms Angela [sic] H. Oei. Her effort captivated the audience, and but for the fact that encores were not allowed she would most certainly have been recalled. We have attended recitals great and strange in three capitals of Europe, but we must admit that this, the song of Miss Angela Oei staggered us. We repeat the novelty in a nutshell: a Chinese girl from Sumatra [sic!] singing a French classic in French to an English audience. Surely this is a world’s record! Is the East, after all, so far apart from the West?

"In March 1907 Angèle gave a vocal recital in Semarang, a soirée musicale, in the THHK school building in a fund-raiser for the school. She was accompanied by her sixteen-year-old niece, Lim Tshoen, from Singapore and her twelve-year-old nephew, Arthur Lim, on piano. Angèle performed pieces by French composers: Charles Gounod (”Siebel” in Faust) and Georges Bizet (from the opera Carmen) in elegant, fluent French.".

The progressive outlook and attainments of the Oei sisters received the admiration of R.A. Kartini, a Javanese aristocrat and pioneering women's rights activist. Despite their cosmopolitan background, the Oei sisters' contact with Javanese culture appears to have been restricted to interactions with servants, and being taken by their mother on courtesy visits and gamelan performances to various Javanese royal courts.

Marriage to Beauchamp Caulfield-Stoker (1909–1920)
In 1909, in Semarang, Indonesia, Hui-lan (using the surname Oeitiongham) married Beauchamp Forde Gordon Caulfield-Stoker (1877–1949), an Anglo-Irishman who was the British consular agent in Semarang, and eventually represented his father-in-law's sugar interests in London. In 1924, Madame Koo returned to her native Semarang for the funeral of her father, who had recently died in Singapore; she acted as mourner-in-chief, representing her absent mother as senior wife. In 1925, the Koos hosted the Chinese elder statesman Sun Yat-sen and his wife, Soong Ching-ling, for a long stay at their Beijing residence, where Sun later died.

During Hui-lan's time in China, the country was undergoing a very turbulent period in its political history the so-called warlord era, in which different military and political factions sought supremacy in the new, republican Chinese state. Wellington Koo served twice as Acting Premier, first in 1924, then again from 1 October 1926 until 16 June 1927. During his second term, Koo also acted as President of the Republic of China, which made Hui-lan – for a very brief period – First Lady of China.

With Koo out of office in 1927, the couple settled down in Shanghai, then the fourth-largest port city in the world. Hui-lan's social circle in Shanghai included the businessman Sir Victor Sassoon and Wallis Warfield Simpson, later Duchess of Windsor. Hui-lan recalls in her memoirs that Wallis's only phrase in Mandarin was "boy, pass me the champagne".

Hui-lan, however, found Shanghai in the 1920s wanting, and thought it "filled with...British shipping people...nobodies at home...[who] put on upper-class airs in China...they were so insular, so middle-class...and looked down their noses at everything really beautiful and indigenous to...[Chinese] culture: jade, porcelain, antiques. And the poor foolish Shanghai Chinese were so impressed with these upstarts that they copied their manners and filled their houses with 'Western' furniture (the so-called smart Shanghai furniture all came from Grand Rapids and was heavy and ugly)." In contrast, she was enamoured of pre-communist Beijing, whose classical order and ancient beauty she thought was comparable only to Paris. In later life, she exclaimed: "Peking is my city, where I once belonged and where I hope someday, if things ever change in my lifetime, to return."

Ambassadress and World War  II
The Koos subsequently relocated to Paris in 1932, where Wellington Koo had been appointed Chinese Ambassador to France, a post he kept until 1940. Following the fall of France to Germany during the Second World War, Koo served as Chinese Ambassador to the United Kingdom in London until 1946. Koo represented the Republic of China in 1945 as one of the founding members of the United Nations.

All through this time, Madame Wellington Koo was a celebrated society hostess in Paris and London. The great inheritance from Hui-lan's father ensured that the couple could afford to entertain the beau monde of Paris and London on a scale that was beyond the means of most diplomats. In the summer of 1939, she attended Elsie de Wolfe's party for the Maharani of Kapurthala at Villa Trianon in Versailles with a guest list that included Coco Chanel and Elsa Schiaparelli; some considered it Europe's last swan song before the Second World War.

She also oversaw the education of her two sons by Koo, Yu-chang Wellington Koo Jr. (1922–1975) and Fu-chang Freeman Koo (1923–1977), who attended MacJannet School in Paris, where they were contemporaries of Prince Philip of Greece and Denmark, later husband of Queen Elizabeth II. Her eldest son, Lionel Caulfield-Stoker, lived in England with his father and stepmother, Nora.

Later life
In 1941, Oei moved to New York City, where her sons Wellington Koo Jr. and Freeman Koo were educated at their father's alma mater, Columbia University. Her aim was to use her international connections to persuade the United States to join the war on the Allied side to help China's war effort in Asia. Although the Koos were later reunited in New York, the war years and separation had taken their toll; and the couple divorced in 1958. She spent the remainder of her life in New York City.

She authored two autobiographies in collaboration, first in 1943 with the society columnist for The Washington Post Mary Van Rensselaer Thayer, then in 1975 with the journalist Isabella Taves. In the 1980s, she was involved in a series of unsuccessful business ventures in her native Indonesia, including shipping, tobacco and bicycles.

By the time she died in 1992, she had survived her former husband and both their sons. Her son by her first marriage had died in 1954. The business empire her grandfather and father built had been broken up by Sukarno following the Indonesian Revolution; and the Republic of China which she and her husband served for many decades had lost the Chinese mainland to the Communist Party.

Style, art and legacy
Madame Koo was much admired for her adaptations of traditional Chinese dress, which she wore with lace trousers and jade necklaces. She is widely acknowledged for reinventing the Chinese cheongsam in a way that accentuates and flatters the female figure. Cheongsam dresses at the time were decorously slit a few inches up the sides, but Hui-lan slashed hers to the knee – in the heady 1920s – "with lace pantelettes just visible to the ankle". She thereby helped modernize, glamorize and popularize what soon became the Chinese female national dress. Unlike other Asian socialites, Madame Wellington Koo insisted on using local silks and materials, which she thought were of superior quality.

She was featured several times by Vogue Magazine on its list of best-dressed women in the 1920s, 1930s and 1940s. Vogue saluted Madame Koo in 1942 as "a Chinese citizen of the world, an international beauty", for her enlightened approach to promoting goodwill between East and West.

An astute and avant-garde art connoisseur, Madame Wellington Koo sat for portraits by Federico Beltrán Masses, Edmund Dulac, Leon Underwood Olive Snell, Olive Pell, and Charles Tharp, and had her photographs taken by the fashion and society photographers Henry Walter Barnett, E. O. Hoppé, Horst P. Horst, Bassano, and George Hoyningen-Huene.

Her portraits, photographs and dresses are today part of the collections of the National Portrait Gallery in London, the Metropolitan Museum of Art in New York, and the Peranakan Museum in Singapore.

In contemporary culture
Madame Koo's fashion legacy continues to attract attention internationally. She was featured as a "woman of style" at China: Through the Looking Glass, an art exhibition curated by Andrew Bolton and Harold Koda, and held to great acclaim in 2015 at the Metropolitan Museum of Art. In 2018, the Indonesian designer Toton Januar created a video campaign for his Fall Winter collection, based on a reimagining of one of Madame Koo's portraits.

In her native Indonesia, Madame Koo has been the subject of a string of recent publications. Under the pen name Agnes Davonar, popular writers Agnes Li and Teddy Li authored a sentimental and sensationalist biography of Madame Koo, Kisah tragis Oei Hui Lan, putri orang terkaya di Indonesia (The Tragic Story of Oei Hui Lan, Daughter of Indonesia's Richest Man), published in 2009 by AD Publisher. Oei Hui Lan: anak orang terkaya dari Semarang (Oei Hui lan: Daughter of Semarang's Richest Man), another popular biography, was published by Eidelweis Mahameru in 2011. That same year, Mahameru published a popular biography of Madame Koo's father, Oei Tiong Ham: Raja Gula, Orang Terkaya dari Semarang (Oei Tiong Ham: Sugar King, Semarang's Richest Man).

Ancestry

List of works
Hui-lan Koo (Madame Wellington Koo): An Autobiography as Told to Mary Van Rensselaer Thayer New York: Dial Press (1943)
No Feast Lasts Forever New York: Times Books (1975)

See also
 Cabang Atas: her social class in colonial Indonesia
 History of the Republic of China
 Politics of the Republic of China
 First Lady of the Republic of China
 Nellie Yu Roung Ling – first Chinese modern dancer and fashion designer

References

1889 births
1992 deaths
Cabang Atas
Women in China
Women centenarians
Chinese Civil War refugees
Chinese socialites
Indonesian socialites
First ladies of the Republic of China
Indonesian people of Chinese descent
People of the Dutch East Indies
People from Semarang
Family of Majoor Oei Tiong Ham
Indonesian centenarians
Indonesian women writers